Klaus Tschira (7 December 1940 – 31 March 2015) was a German billionaire entrepreneur and the co-founder of the German software company SAP AG.

Life 
After gaining his Diplom in physics and working at IBM, Tschira co-founded the German software giant SAP AG in 1972 in Mannheim, Germany together with Hans-Werner Hector, Dietmar Hopp, Hasso Plattner and Claus Wellenreuther. From 1998 to 2007, he was a board member at SAP. He was married to Gerda Tschira and had two sons, Harald and Udo.

He died on 31 March 2015 in Heidelberg.

Klaus Tschira Foundation 
The Klaus Tschira Foundation (KTF) was established by Tschira in 1995 as a non-profit organization. Its primary objective is to support projects in natural and computer sciences as well as mathematics. The KTF places strong emphasis on public understanding in these fields. Tschira's commitment to this objective was honored in 1999 with the "Deutscher Stifterpreis" by the German National Academic Foundation (German: Studienstiftung). The KTF is located at the Villa Bosch in Heidelberg, Germany, the former residence of Nobel Prize laureate for chemistry Carl Bosch (1874–1940).

Gerda and Klaus Tschira Foundation 
In 2008, Tschira and his wife Gerda founded the Gerda and Klaus Tschira Foundation.

Honors 

 1995: Honorary doctorate of the University of Klagenfurt
 1997: Honorary senator of the University of Heidelberg
 1999: Order of Merit of the Federal Republic of Germany (Verdienstkreuz am Bande)
 1999: Honorary senator of the Karlsruhe Institute of Technology (KIT)
 1999: Deutscher Stifterpreis by the German National Academic Foundation
 2000: Naming the asteroid 13028 Klaustschira by the International Astronomical Union IAU for supporting the miniaturized satellite DIVA
 2003: Fellow of the Gesellschaft für Informatik
 2007: Konrad-Zuse-Badge
 2007: Rudolf-Diesel-Medaille by the German Institute for Inventions
 2008: Alwin-Walther-Medal
 2008: Honorary senator of the Heidelberg College of Education
 2009: Order of Merit of the Federal Republic of Germany (Verdienstkreuz 1. Klasse)
 2010: Honorary doctorate of Karlsruhe Institute of Technology (KIT)
 2010: Leibniz-Medal by the Berlin-Brandenburg Academy of Sciences and Humanities
 2011: Honorary member of the Astronomische Gesellschaft
 Honorary senator of the University of Mannheim

See also 
List of billionaires

References

External links 
 Klaus Tschira Foundation

1940 births
2015 deaths
German billionaires
Officers Crosses of the Order of Merit of the Federal Republic of Germany
German company founders
German corporate directors
20th-century German businesspeople
21st-century German businesspeople
SAP SE people
IBM employees